is a Japanese surname. People with the name include:

Arts and entertainment
Devon Aoki (born 1982), model and actress, daughter of "Rocky" Aoki
Kazuyo Aoki (born 1947), Japanese voice actress
Mayuko Aoki (born 1975), voice actor
Mitsue Aoki (born 1969), Japanese manga author and artist
, Japanese voice actress and singer
Sayaka Aoki (comedian) (born 1973), Japanese comedian
Sayaka Aoki (voice actress) (born 1972), Japanese voice actress, also goes by Shizuka Aoki
Shigeru Aoki, Japanese painter
, Japanese actor, voice actor, model and fashion designer
Shoichi Aoki, creator of the Fruits and Fresh Fruits photobooks
Steve Aoki, Japanese American record producer, son of Rocky Aoki
Takao Aoki, manga artist
Tatsu Aoki, jazz double bass player and record producer
Tomohiko Aoki, light novel author
, Japanese actor and model
Tsuru Aoki (1892–1961), Japanese-American stage and screen actress
Ume Aoki, female Japanese manga artist
Yoshino Aoki, Japanese video game music composer
Yūji Aoki (1945–2003), Japanese manga artist
Yuko Aoki (born 1977), Japanese bikini model
Yuya Aoki, one of the pen names of Japanese author, Tadashi Agi

Politicians
Ai Aoki (born 1965), Japanese politician
Kazuhiko Aoki (born 1961), Japanese politician, son of Mikio Aoki
Kazuo Aoki, Japanese government minister during the Second Sino-Japanese War, and into World War II
Mikio Aoki (born 1934), Japanese politician, father of Kazuhiko Aoki
Aoki Shūzō (1844–1914), Japanese diplomat in the Meiji and Taishō eras

Sportspersons
Ai Aoki (born 1985), synchronised swimmer
, Japanese Paralympic swimmer
, Japanese fencer
Go Aoki (born 1999), Japanese curler
Hayato Aoki (born 1977), former Nippon Professional Baseball player, current coach
Hiroaki "Rocky" Aoki (1938–2009), Japanese American former Olympic wrestler, founder of Benihana restaurants
Isao Aoki (born 1942), golfer
, Japanese ice hockey player
Kota Aoki (born 1987), Japanese footballer
, Japanese speed skater
, Japanese hurdler
Mik Aoki (born 1968), American college baseball coach
Aoki brothers, Nobuatsu, Takuma and Haruchika, three brothers who were all Grand Prix motorcycle riders
Nori Aoki (born 1982), Japanese baseball player who plays for the New York Mets
, Japanese swimmer
Ryota Aoki (born 1984), Japanese footballer
Ryota Aoki (born 1996), Japanese footballer
Sayaka Aoki (born 1986), Japanese athlete
Shinya Aoki (born 1983), mixed martial artist
Takahiro Aoki (born 1981), Nippon Professional Baseball player
Takayuki Aoki, Japanese racing driver
Takeshi Aoki, Japanese footballer
, Japanese basketball player and coach
Takuya Aoki (born 1990), Japanese footballer
Tomomi Aoki (born 1994), Japanese swimmer
, Japanese footballer
Yozo Aoki (born 1929), Japanese footballer

Other
Guy Aoki, head and co-founder of the Media Action Network for Asian Americans
, Japanese Buddhist monk and artist
Kikuyo Aoki (born 1968), professional Go player
Masakatsu Aoki (born 1957), amateur astronomer
Richard Aoki (1938–2009), Japanese American civil rights activist
Shinichi Aoki (born 1965), professional Go player
Taijiro Aoki, a captain of the Imperial Japanese Navy

References

Japanese-language surnames